Disha Poovaiah is an Indian actress who works predominantly in Kannada films.

Career 
Disha Poovaiah appeared in a cameo role in 2011 Kannada language film Hudugaru. Of her role in the film, she said, "In ‘Hudugaru’ I made a small presence opposite Vishal Hegde and I accepted only because it was Puneeth Rajkumar film". In the same year, she appeared in Police Story 3. In 2013, The year also saw her release Slum. In 2014, Poovaiah filmed with Nam Life Story, a film based on a true story of six Bangalorean friends on their stay in Tamil Nadu.

As of 2019, she was filming with Gadhayuddha, playing the love interest of a middle-aged bachelor.

Filmography

All films are in Kannada, unless otherwise noted.

References

External links 
 
 

Living people
Kannada actresses
21st-century Indian actresses
Actresses in Kannada cinema
Indian film actresses
Year of birth missing (living people)